The 2001 Abierto Mexicano Pegaso was a tennis tournament played on outdoor clay courts at the Fairmont Acapulco Princess in Acapulco in Mexico that was part of the International Series Gold of the 2001 ATP Tour and of Tier III of the 2001 WTA Tour. The tournament was held from February 26 through March 4, 2001.

Finals

Men's singles

 Gustavo Kuerten defeated  Galo Blanco 6–4, 6–2
 It was Kuerten's 2nd title of the year and the 19th of his career.

Women's singles

 Amanda Coetzer defeated  Elena Dementieva 2–6, 6–1, 6–2
 It was Coetzer's 2nd title of the year and the 16th of her career.

Men's doubles

 Donald Johnson /  Gustavo Kuerten defeated  David Adams /  Martín García 6–3, 7–6(7–5)
 It was Johnson's 1st title of the year and the 15th of his career. It was Kuerten's 3rd title of the year and the 20th of his career.

Women's doubles

 María José Martínez /  Anabel Medina Garrigues defeated  Virginia Ruano Pascual /  Paola Suárez 6–4, 6–7(5–7), 7–5
 It was Martínez's 1st title of the year and the 1st of her career. It was Medina Garrigues' 1st title of the year and the 1st of her career.

External links
 Official website 
 ATP Tournament Profile
 WTA Tournament Profile

 
2001
Abierto Mexicano Pegaso
Abierto Mexicano Pegaso
February 2001 sports events in Mexico
March 2001 sports events in Mexico